Chase is an unincorporated community located in the town of Chase, Oconto County, Wisconsin, United States.

References

Unincorporated communities in Oconto County, Wisconsin
Unincorporated communities in Wisconsin
Green Bay metropolitan area